The new wave of new wave (NWONW) was a term coined by music journalists to describe a subgenre of the British alternative rock scene in the early 1990s, in which bands displayed post-punk and new wave influences, particularly from bands such as The Clash, Blondie, Wire, and The Stranglers. The associated bands generally played guitar-based rock music often accompanied by keyboards. The movement was short-lived, and several of the bands involved were later linked with the more commercially successful Britpop, which it immediately preceded, and the NWONW was described by John Harris of The Guardian (one of the journalists who first coined the term) as "Britpop without the good bits". The NME played a major part in promoting and covering the genre, and promoted the On event, which featured many of the bands they had labelled NWONW.

Record label Fierce Panda's first release, Shagging in the Streets, was a tribute to the scene, featuring S*M*A*S*H, Done Lying Down, These Animal Men, and others. Associated bands have included Elastica, S*M*A*S*H, Menswear, Sleeper, Echobelly, Shed Seven, These Animal Men, and Compulsion.

Robert Christgau identified the mid-1990s NWONW movement as the peak of a new wave revival that has continued on and off since, stating "1994 was the top of a curve we can't be certain we've reached the bottom of".

References

Britpop
New wave music
British styles of music
British rock music genres